HT-7, or Hefei Tokamak-7, is an experimental superconducting tokamak nuclear fusion reactor built in Hefei, China, to investigate the process of developing fusion power. The HT-7 was developed with the assistance of Russia, and was based on the earlier T-7 tokamak reactor. The reactor was built by the Hefei-based Institute of Plasma Physics under the direction of the Chinese Academy of Sciences.

The HT-7 construction was completed in May 1994, with final tests accomplished by December of the same year allowing experiments to proceed.

The HT-7 has been superseded by the Experimental Advanced Superconducting Tokamak (EAST) built in Hefei by the Institute of Plasma Physics as an experimental reactor before ITER is completed.

References

Reactor data
Report on the reactor 

Tokamaks
Buildings and structures in Hefei
Chinese Academy of Sciences
Nuclear power in China